Metachanda declinata is a moth species in the oecophorine tribe Metachandini. It was described by Edward Meyrick in 1924. Its type locality is on Mauritius.

References

Oecophorinae
Moths described in 1924
Taxa named by Edward Meyrick
Moths of Mauritius